The Rattlesnake River is a  river in eastern New Hampshire in the United States. It is a tributary of the Cocheco River, part of the Piscataqua River watershed leading to the Atlantic Ocean.

The river is located entirely in the town of Farmington.

See also

List of rivers of New Hampshire

References

Rivers of New Hampshire
Rivers of Strafford County, New Hampshire